Laxarby IF is a Swedish football club located in Bengtsfors

External links
Official site 

Football clubs in Västra Götaland County